Ceratozamia latifolia is a species of cycad in the family Zamiaceae that is endemic to Querétaro, Hidalgo and San Luis Potosí in Mexico. It inhabits cloud zone oak forests in the Sierra Madre Oriental.

References

latifolia
Endemic flora of Mexico
Flora of Hidalgo (state)
Flora of Querétaro
Flora of San Luis Potosí
Endangered plants
Endangered biota of Mexico
Taxonomy articles created by Polbot
Flora of the Sierra Madre Oriental